Ponnuru is a neighbourhood in Guntur district of the Indian state of Andhra Pradesh. Ponnur municipality of Tenali revenue division.

Government and politics 

Ponnur Municipality is the governmental body.

Transport 

Nidubrolu railway station is classified as a D–category station in the Vijayawada railway division of South Central Railway zone. There are frequent public bus services available from Tenali and Guntur, as all passenger train services from Tenali were extended to Guntur.

Prominent citizens 

 N.G Ranga - Gandhian and former MP
 Pamulapati Ankineedu Prasada Rao - Former Member of Parliament
 T. R. K. Prasad - former Cabinet Secretary, Govt. of India
 Yetukuri Venkata Narasayya - Telugu poet
 Kotha Satyanarayana Chowdary - Telugu poet
 Kondaveeti Venkatakavi - Telugu poet
 Talluri Satyanarayana - Telugu poet
 Talluri Jiyyarudasu - Revolutionary
 Colonel P. L. N. Chowdary
 Pragada Koatayya - President, Weavers Congress
 Billuri Kotaiah Nayudu (Retd Captain, President Medal Winner)
 Kathi Padmarao (Dalit leader)
 GURU BALU POET,LEADER.

References 

Villages in Guntur district